Rudolf Krause (21 January 1927 – 12 December 2003) was a German footballer and coach who won a silver medal as manager of East Germany at the 1980 Summer Olympics.

Krause played as a striker in the Oberliga and scored 111 goals in the East German top flight. The prolific forward also won two caps for East Germany in the mid 1950s.

References

External links
 
 
 

1927 births
2003 deaths
Footballers from Leipzig
German footballers
East German footballers
East Germany international footballers
1. FC Frankfurt players
FC Sachsen Leipzig players
1. FC Lokomotive Leipzig players
German football managers
East German football managers
1. FC Lokomotive Leipzig managers
East Germany national football team managers
DDR-Oberliga players
Association football forwards